Yeniköy is a small town in the District of Koçarlı, Aydın Province, Turkey. As of 2010 it had a population of 1475 people.

References

Populated places in Aydın Province
Koçarlı District
Towns in Turkey